Time Masters may refer to

 The Time Masters, a science fiction novel by Wilson Tucker
 Time Masters, a 1995 novel by Gary Blackwood
 Les Maîtres du temps, a Franco-Hungarian animated science fiction film
 Time Masters, a DC comic book series starring Rip Hunter
 Time Masters, an organization appearing in Legends of Tomorrow
 Time Masters (game show), a 1996–98 Australian kids game show for Seven Network